Fusiaphera macrospira, common name the big-spired nutmeg, is a species of sea snail, a marine gastropod mollusk in the family Cancellariidae, the nutmeg snails.

Description
The shell size varies between 14 mm and 30 mm.

Distribution
This species is distributed in the Eastern Indian Ocean and in the Western Pacific Ocean.

References

External links
 
 Hemmen J. (2007). Recent Cancellariidae. Wiesbaden, 428 pp.
 Bouchet P. & Petit R. E. (2008). "New species and new records of southwest Pacific Cancellariidae". The Nautilus 122(1): 1–18.

Cancellariidae
Gastropods described in 1850